The 2012 Cherwell District Council election was held on 3 May 2012 to elect members of the Cherwell Council in England. This was the same day as other 2012 United Kingdom local elections.

References

2012 English local elections
2012
2010s in Oxfordshire